The Jewett was an automobile built in Detroit, Michigan by the Paige-Detroit Motor Car Company from  March 1922 through December 1926. The Jewett was named after Harry M. Jewett, president of Paige-Detroit.

History
After the first 17 months of production, approx. 40,000 vehicles were sold. The car was marketed as a Jewett 'Six' — a companion to the Paige, the primary product of Paige-Detroit. The 1922-24 cars had a 50 h.p. Jewett motor, the 1925 cars had a 55 h.p. Jewett motor and the 1926 cars had a 40-hp Continental motor. For several years, Jewett cars featured a powerful straight-six engine that could climb mountains. The last of the vehicles were available with hydraulic brakes.

The company was purchased by the Graham Brothers on January 3, 1927 and the Jewett became a Paige, for that year only. The car was then rebranded as a Graham-Paige for 1928 only.

Jewett Dash Plates
Embedded in the dashboard of every Jewett was an amulet, visible on the passenger side as a dash-plate. Harry's wife Mary was something of a spiritualist, and these amulets were purported to have mystical power that protected the occupants. Harry Jewett's estate, once a great plantation, has all but vanished. The ruins near Rose City in Northern Lower Michigan are still visible. Discussions about restoring parts of the estate as a historical park have not yet borne fruit.

See also
 Jewett Five-Passenger Coach
 Jewett 'Six' Registry, www.jewettsix.org
 Also see Notre Dame Athletic History of Harry M. Jewett

References

Defunct motor vehicle manufacturers of the United States
Motor vehicle manufacturers based in Michigan
Defunct manufacturing companies based in Detroit
Vintage vehicles
1920s cars
Cars introduced in 1922